Milton Nascimento (born October 26, 1942), also known as Bituca, is a Brazilian singer-songwriter and multi-instrumentalist.

He has toured across the world.

Nascimento has won five Grammy Awards, including Best World Music Album for his album Nascimento in 1998.

Biography
Milton Nascimento was born in Rio de Janeiro. His mother, Maria Nascimento, was a maid. As a baby, Nascimento was adopted by a couple who were his mother's former employers; Josino Brito Campos, a bank employee, mathematics teacher and electronic technician and Lília Silva Campos, a music teacher and choir singer. When he was 18 months old, Nascimento's biological mother died, and he moved with his adoptive parents to the city of Três Pontas, in the state of Minas Gerais.

When Nascimento was a child, he was nicknamed "Bituca" because he pouted when he was upset, which made him look like a native botocudo.

Nascimento was an occasional DJ on a radio station that his father once ran. He lived in the boroughs of Laranjeiras and Tijuca in Rio de Janeiro.

Clube da Esquina 
In the early stages of his career, Nascimento played in two samba groups, Evolussamba and Sambacana. In 1963, he moved to Belo Horizonte, where his friendship with Lô Borges led to the Clube da Esquina ("street corner club") movement. Members included Beto Guedes, Toninho Horta, Wagner Tiso, and Flávio Venturini, with whom he shared compositions and melodies.  One composition was "Canção do Sal", which was first interpreted by singer Elis Regina in 1966, and led to a television appearance with Nascimento. The collective, as well as some others, released Clube da Esquina in 1972. Several hit singles were also released.

Nascimento's compositions include songs such as  "Maria, Maria", "Canção da América" ("Song from America"/"Unencounter"), "Travessia" ("Bridges"), "Bailes da Vida", and "Coração de Estudante" ("Student's Heart"), a song about the funeral of Edson Luís, who was killed by police officers in 1968. The song became the hymn for the Diretas Já social-political campaign in 1984, was played at the funeral of President of Brazil Tancredo Neves the next year, and was also played at Ayrton Senna's funeral.

While his reputation within Brazil was firmly established with his Clube da Esquina works, Nascimento's international breakthrough came with his appearance on jazz saxophonist Wayne Shorter's 1974 album Native Dancer. This led to widespread acclaim, and collaborations with Paul Simon, Sarah Vaughan, Mercedes Sosa, Carlos Santana, Pablo Milanés, Cat Stevens, George Duke, Quincy Jones and Earth, Wind And Fire. Angelus (1994) features appearances by Pat Metheny, Ron Carter, Herbie Hancock, Jack DeJohnette, Nana Vasconcelos, Jon Anderson, James Taylor, and Peter Gabriel, among many others. Through his friendship with guitarist Warren Cuccurullo, Nascimento came to work with the pop rock band Duran Duran in 1993.  Nascimento co-wrote and performed the song "Breath After Breath", featured on the band's 1993 album Duran Duran. He also performed with the band in concert when they toured in Brazil in support of that album.

In 1996, Nascimento contributed the song "Dancing" to the AIDS benefit album Red Hot + Rio, produced by the Red Hot Organization.

Ser Minas Tão Gerais 
Nascimento starred in the 2002 musical theater piece Ser Minas Tão Gerais by the group Ponto de Partida. The piece paid homage to the poetry of Nascimento and Carlos Drummond de Andrade, two "iconic" poets from Minas Gerais.

In 2004, he worked with the Brazilian heavy metal band Angra, on the song "Late Redemption" from their album Temple of Shadows.

Discography

1967: Milton Nascimento (Travessia)
1969: Courage 
1969: Milton Nascimento
1970: Milton	
1972: Clube da Esquina (with Lô Borges)
1973: Milagre dos Peixes
1974: Native Dancer (with Wayne Shorter)
1975: Minas
1976: Geraes
1976: Milton (Raça) (with Wayne Shorter and Herbie Hancock)
1978: Clube da Esquina 2 
1979: Journey to Dawn
1980: Sentinela	
1981: Caçador de Mim
1982: Anima
1982: Ponta de Areia
1982: Missa dos Quilombos (with Pedro Casaldáliga and Pedro Tierra)
1983: Ao Vivo
1985: Encontros e Despedidas 
1986: A Barca dos Amantes (with Wayne Shorter)
1987: Yauaretê (with Wayne Shorter and Herbie Hancock)
1989: Miltons with Herbie Hancock

1990: Canção da America
1990: Txai
1992: Noticias do Brasil
1993: Três Pontas
1994: Angelus (with Wayne Shorter, Herbie Hancock, James Taylor and Jon Anderson)
1994: O Planeta Blue na Estrada do Sol
1996: Amigo
1997: Nascimento
1998: Tambores de Minas
1999: Crooner 	
2000: Nos Bailes da Vida
2001: Gil & Milton (with Gilberto Gil)
2003: Pietá
2003: Music for Sunday Lovers
2005: O Coronel e o Lobisomem
2007: Milagre dos Peixes: Ao Vivo
2008: Novas Bossas
2008: Belmondo & Milton Nascimento
2010: ...E a Gente Sonhando2010: Under Tokyo Skies  (with Herbie Hancock)
2011: Nada Será Como Antes: O Musical 
2013: Uma Travessia: 50 Anos de Carreira2015: Tamarear (with Dudu Lima Trio)

Compilations
2000: Oratório 
2004: Maria Maria / Ultimo TremAcademic title

 Honorary doctorate of music, awarded by the Berklee College of Music.

References

Sources

Perrone, Charles A. Masters of Contemporary Brazilian Song: MPB 1965-1985''. Austin: University of Texas Press, 1989. Chapter 4.

External links

  – official website
 
 Interview with Milton Nascimento, 1988 
 Milton Nascimento: 12 Essential Performances by Ted Gioia (jazz.com)

Brazilian guitarists
Brazilian pianists
1942 births
Living people
Grammy Award winners
Latin Grammy Award winners
Latin Grammy Lifetime Achievement Award winners
Latin music songwriters
Acoustic guitarists
Música Popular Brasileira guitarists
Música Popular Brasileira singers
Blue Note Records artists
Far Out Recordings artists
Nonesuch Records artists
Warner Records artists
Musicians from Rio de Janeiro (city)
20th-century guitarists
21st-century guitarists
20th-century pianists
21st-century pianists
20th-century Brazilian male singers
20th-century Brazilian singers
21st-century Brazilian male singers
21st-century Brazilian singers
Male pianists
Brazilian male singer-songwriters
CTI Records artists
Culture in Minas Gerais
Brazilian jazz singers